Outlaw 4 Life: 2005 A.P. is the fourth studio album by Outlawz, It was released on April 19, 2005.  The Letters A.P. in the title mean "After Pac" referring to their former groupmate and rapper Tupac Shakur who was shot in 1996, nine years before the release of the album.

Track listing

Chart positions

2005 albums
Outlawz albums
Albums produced by E.D.I.
Albums produced by Focus...
Albums produced by The Legendary Traxster
33rd Street Records albums
Gangsta rap albums by American artists